Pisté is a village in Tinum Municipality in the center of Yucatán State, Mexico. It is best known for the Mayan archaeological site Chichen Itza and the cenote Ik Kil. There are a variety of hotels serving the tourist sites.

References

Populated places in Yucatán
Tourism in Mexico